Óscar Bautista Villegas (born 6 February 1964) is a Mexican politician affiliated with the PRI. He served as Deputy of the LXII Legislature of the Mexican Congress representing San Luis Potosí, and previously served in the Congress of San Luis Potosí.

References

1964 births
Living people
Members of the Congress of San Luis Potosí
Institutional Revolutionary Party politicians
21st-century Mexican politicians
Autonomous University of San Luis Potosi alumni
Politicians from Veracruz
People from Tantoyuca
Deputies of the LXII Legislature of Mexico
Members of the Chamber of Deputies (Mexico) for San Luis Potosí